Destiny Rose is a Philippine television drama series broadcast by GMA Network. Directed by Don Michael Perez, it stars Ken Chan in the title role. It premiered on September 14, 2015 on the network's Afternoon Prime line up replacing Healing Hearts. The series concluded on March 11, 2016 with a total of 130 episodes. It was replaced by The Millionaire's Wife in its timeslot.

The series is streaming online on YouTube.

Premise
Joey Flores-Vegara is a woman trapped in a man's body who dreams and hopes to be the best for her parents. She struggles in life yet continues to be patient and understanding. Joey becomes a stronger person in her new life as Destiny Rose as she faces more challenges in her journey to becoming a renowned writer and a full-fledged woman.

Cast and characters

Lead cast
 Ken Chan as Joselito "Joey" Flores Vergara Jr. / Destiny Rose Flores-Antonioni

Supporting cast
 Fabio Ide as Gabriele Antonioni
 Manilyn Reynes as Daisy Flores-Vergara
 Michael De Mesa as Rosauro Armani Vitto
 Katrina Halili as Jasmine Flores
 Sheena Halili as April Rose Flores Vergara
 Jackie Lou Blanco as Maria Dahlia Flores
 Jeric Gonzales as Vince
 Joko Diaz as Joselito "Lito" Vergara Sr.
 Irma Adlawan as Bethilda Vitto-Jacobs
 JC Tiuseco as Lance
 Ken Alfonso as Aris

Guest cast
 Melissa Mendez as Yvonne Antonioni
 Kate Valdez as Violet Vitto Jacobs
 Sig Aldeen as Mario Capello
 Bryan Benedict as Stephen
 Tony Lapeña as Elvie
 Rene Salud as Salvatore
 Lander Vera Perez as Hector Tobias
 Mimi Juareza as Lady Edelweiss
 Tonio Quiazon as Anton
 Miggs Cuaderno as young Joey 
 Ar Angel Aviles as young April
 Milkcah Wynne Nacion as young Jasmine
 Andrea Torres as herself
 Mike Tan as himself
 Yasmien Kurdi as herself

Ratings
According to AGB Nielsen Philippines' Mega Manila household television ratings, the pilot episode of Destiny Rose earned a 14.8% rating. While the final episode scored a 17.2% rating.

Accolades

References

External links
 
 

2015 Philippine television series debuts
2016 Philippine television series endings
2010s LGBT-related drama television series
Filipino-language television shows
GMA Network drama series
Philippine LGBT-related television shows
Television shows set in the Philippines
Transgender-related television shows